The American Women's Hospitals Service (AWHS) is a charitable organization that promotes the relief of suffering worldwide by supporting independent clinics to provide care to high risk populations and by providing travel grants to medical students and residents to perform clinical projects abroad in under-served areas.  They are partnered with the American Medical Women's Association (AMWA) - an organization of women physicians, medical students and others seeking the advancement of women in medicine.

Early history

In 1917 the Medical Women's National Association (which was later renamed AMWA) established a war service committee in order to create a census of the medical women in the country and to plan how to apply their resources to the war effort. World War I had already entered into its third year, women at that time were not accepted by military branches of the government, and the government had no plan to organize them for war service. The war service committee, adopting the name American Women's Hospitals, decided that they wanted to provide individual medical service abroad and also establish military hospitals overseas.

In its first year, AWH partnered with the Red Cross and civilian medical organizations to send abroad 62 AWH volunteer doctors as well as 30 technicians and lay workers to France, Serbia, Palestine and Greece. AWH also established its first hospital in Neufmoutiers-en-Brie, France, in July 1918. This hospital, financed entirely by AWH, had 25 beds and a staff of 15 women. In the US, AWH arranged for hospitals for convalescent soldiers, for care for soldiers' dependents, and for laboratory training courses in order to address the critical shortage at that time of skilled lab workers.

Although the armistice was signed a year later, the ensuing local wars, revolutions, earthquakes, famine and millions of destitute refugees meant that medical assistance remained urgently needed around the world. AWH expanded its service at home and multiple countries abroad in order to address the thousands who looked for help.

See also
Rosalie Slaughter Morton
Mary M. Crawford

References

External links 

 

Organizations established in 1917
Medical associations based in the United States
Women's organizations based in the United States
Medical and health organizations based in Illinois
Women in medicine